UniAIMOV also known as just AIMOV is a Light Armored vehicle based on the Land Rover Defender chassis developed and manufactured by the Sri Lanka Electrical and Mechanical Engineers.

Design 
AIMOV is a 4x4 light armored High-Mobility/Forward Command vehicle built on Land Rover chassis with seating for 5 including driver and operator. External racks have been added for 4-8 men to easily hang on to the vehicle during emergency exfiltration. It is protected from land mines and hand grenades. It is equipped with Run-flat tire, greater shielding on vital components such as engines and transmission, design that reduces crew fatigue, day-night cameras that provide 360 degree vision, VHF base station and can launch & operate short ranged drones for aerial surveillance. It is fully air conditioned for crew comfort. 

The vehicle was designed mainly for urban warfare, counter-insurgency and special operations. It can also be used as a command center for the ground commander who can maintain real time communications with HQ.

Production history 

The UniAIMOV was first unveiled to the public in December 2020 during the opening of the SLEME Base Workshop Homagama.

See also 

 Unibuffel
 Unicorn APC
 Snatch Land Rover
 MDT David

References 

Post–Cold War military equipment of Sri Lanka
Military vehicles introduced in the 2010s
Vehicles of Sri Lanka